Mohammad Iqbal Khan  was a senior general in the Pakistan Army who served as the third Chairman Joint Chiefs of Staff Committee from being appointed in 1980 until 1984.

Biography
Mohammad Iqbal Khan was educated and graduated from the Military College in Jhelum and was commissioned in the British Indian Army in 1944. He joined the Guides Infantry in the 2nd Frontier Force Regiment as 2nd-Lt. and later serving in the first war with India on Kashmir front in 1947.

After participating in second war with India in 1965, Brigadier Iqbal was appointed as the Director-General of the Military Intelligence in 1969, and was politically involved in supporting the Pakistan Peoples Party (PPP) against the Awami League. Eventually, Brig. Iqbal held the responsibility of Military Intelligence in 1971.

In 1971–73, Major-General Iqbal held the command of the 33rd Infantry Division in Quetta as its GOC, and oversaw the military operations against the armed insurgency groups in Balochistan in Pakistan.

In 1974, Maj-Gen. Iqbal was posted as Chief of General Staff (CGS) under Chief of Army Staff General Tikka Khan at the Army GHQ in Rawalpindi which he served until 1976. In 1976, Maj-Gen. Iqbal was promoted to the three-star rank army general and was posted as field commander of the IV Corps based in Lahore.

In 1977, Lieutenant-General Iqbal took over the control of the Punjab in Pakistan as its martial law administrator when Chief of Army Staff Gen. Zia-ul-Haq imposed the martial law against the civilian government on 5 July 1977. Lt-Gen. Iqbal was later rotated when Lt-Gen. Sawar Khan took command of the IV Corps, and appointed as the field commander of the V Corps and served as the martial law administrator of Sindh in Pakistan.

In 1978, Lt-Gen. Iqbal was again posted at the Army GHQ in Rawalpindi when he was appointed as the Deputy Chief of Army Staff (DCOAS) under President Zia-ul-Haq. During this time, he was appointed as the Colonel Commandant of the Frontier Force Regiment, which he served until his retirement in 1984.

Chairman Joint chiefs (1980–1984)
In 1980, Lt-Gen. Iqbal, who at that time was the senior military officer in the military, was promoted to the four-star rank and appointed as the Chairman Joint Chiefs of Staff Committee.

In 1980, Gen. Iqbal played a crucial role in maintaining of the Afghan Arabs in the country and supported the anti-Russian agitation when Soviet Union intervened in Afghanistan. Gen. iqbal eventually and coordinated the national security meetings concerning the covert efforts in Afghanistan. In 1984, Gen. Iqbal completed his four-year term and eventually retired from the military.

Awards and decorations

Foreign Decorations

References

|-

Year of birth missing
Year of death missing
People from Rawalpindi District
Punjabi people
British Indian Army officers
Frontier Force Regiment officers
Indian military personnel of World War II
Pakistani generals
Pakistani military personnel of the Indo-Pakistani War of 1971
Governors of Punjab, Pakistan
Military government of Pakistan (1977–1988)
Chairmen Joint Chiefs of Staff Committee
People of the Soviet–Afghan War
Recipients of Nishan-e-Imtiaz
Recipients of Sitara-i-Imtiaz